Summer of the Seventeenth Doll is a 1959 Australian-British film directed by Leslie Norman and is based on the Ray Lawler play Summer of the Seventeenth Doll. In the United States the film was released under the title Season of Passion.

Plot
Queensland sugarcane cutters Roo and Barney spend the off season in Sydney each year, seeing their girlfriends. For sixteen years Roo has spent the summer with barmaid Olive, bringing her a kewpie doll, while Barney romances Nancy. In the seventeenth year, Barney arrives to find that Nancy has married; however Olive has arranged a replacement, manicurist Pearl. Roo has had a bad season, losing his place as head of the cane cutting team to a younger man, Dowd.

Barney tries to smooth things over between Roo and Dowd, who falls for Bubba, a girl who has grown up with the cane cutters. Barney leaves to work with Dowd. We learn that Dowd has proposed to Bubba, and she now intends to go with him to Queensland. Roo proposes to Olive, who is devastated by this, refusing his proposal and demanding that Roo return their lives to the way they were. Roo leaves, and we see him next saying farewell to Barney and the other cane cutters, along with Bubba, as they board the train for Queensland. Roo then returns to the bar where Olive is working, and the pair are shown laughing together as Roo drinks his beer.

Cast
Ernest Borgnine as Roo
Anne Baxter as Olive
John Mills as Barney
Angela Lansbury as Pearl
Vincent Ball as Dowd
Ethel Gabriel as Emma
Janette Craig as Bubba
Deryck Barnes as Bluey
Alan García as Dino
Tom Lurich as The Atom Bomber
Dana Wilson as The Bomber's Daughter

Play

Summer of the Seventeenth Doll is a pioneering Australian play written by Ray Lawler and first performed at the Union Theatre in Melbourne, Australia on 28 November 1955. The play is almost unanimously considered by scholars of literature to be the most historically significant in Australian theatre history, openly and authentically portraying distinctly Australian life and characters. It was one of the first truly naturalistic "Australian" theatre productions.

Development
The play premiered in London in 1957 and was a big hit. Film rights were purchased by Hecht Hill Lancaster (HHL) in July 1957 for a reported US$300,000 (or £134,000). The play had reportedly been recommended to Harold Hecht of HHL by Laurence Olivier, who directed the London production.

HHL announced the film would be part of a 12-picture slate to be released through United Artists; other films included Take a Giant Step, The Unforgiven, The Rabbit Trap and Cry Tough. In its announced planning Doll would star Burt Lancaster and Rita Hayworth who had just successfully paired in HHL's Separate Tables, a film which coincidentally featured Australian Rod Taylor, a perfect fit were initial considerations to proceed for the young buck Dowd. James Cagney had appeared in the notifications of interest.

The play debuted on Broadway on 22 January 1958 but only ran 29 performances.

According to John Mills, Carol Reed was going to direct with Burt Lancaster to play Roo and Mills as Barney. However, after the play flopped on Broadway, Mills said that HHL lost enthusiasm, cut the budget, including removing large scale cane cutting sequences. Eventually Leslie Norman (who had previously produced Eureka Stockade and directed The Shiralee in Australia) directed and Ernest Borgnine played the lead. Mills wanted to drop out but was persuaded to stay on by Carol Reed who pointed out it was a good part.

Vincent Ball says his involvement with the film began when John Mills asked Ball to help his daughter Juliet Mills, who was testing for the part of Bubba, with her Australian accent. John Mills then asked Ball to help him with Mills' Australian accent. The producers enquired about Ball's availability; he sent on some footage from A Town Like Alice and Ball was cast in the role. "When Burt Lancaster dropped out the budget went right down," said Ball. 

The one member of the original stage production to repeat her performance for the film was Ethel Gabriel.

Script
HHL assigned the adaptation to John Dighton, who had just written The Devil's Disciple for the company. Dighton travelled to Australia to research the script. He told the press in April 1958 that:
I intend to stick to the play as closely as possible. The two barmaids and the old woman are good characters, but a little more colour is needed in the development of the relationship between the two cane-cutters. In its construction Lawler's play runs downhill all the way. This, I feel, was a weakness. I intend to give the film version what I regard as a necessary build-up to a dramatic peak in the middle.

Leslie Norman later claimed "I want to keep it Australian, but unfortunately the Americans said they couldn't understand the Australian accent and I had to cut out all the Australianisms. That picture broke my heart. ... What buggered him [John Dighton] - and me - was cutting out the Australianness and giving it a more upbeat ending. It is one of the best plays I have ever seen, but I can't say I'm happy with the film."

The film was criticised by some fans of the play, whose complaints were rooted in several criticisms:
The "Americanization" of the text, in particular the casting of American actor Borgnine, who played his character (Roo) with an American accent. Others have thought the film was a recruiting film for migrants with the Englishman John Mills as Barney and Alan Garcia as Dino, an Italian friend and fellow cane cutter who does not feature in the play. The female leads are played by Anne Baxter and Angela Lansbury, though the film features many Australian actors.
The change of location from Melbourne to Sydney. The film is set in Sydney and shows the characters enjoying themselves against the glamorous backdrop of Bondi Beach and Luna Park Sydney rather than the rather more subdued action within the confines of the then working-class Melbourne suburb of Carlton shown in the play.
The drastic changes to key plot points, in particular the alternate, "happy", ending. This alternate ending was considered by some to indicate a serious misunderstanding of the play and its message. The alternate ending may be seen as an attempt to make the film an international success at the box office, with the producers hoping for critical acclaim similar to the kitchen sink realism of Marty. 
The restructuring of the play including adding a scene where Roo takes part in a wrestling match at Luna Park and where Dowd agrees to serve under Roo.

Shooting
Shooting began in December 1953, taking place at Pagewood Studios and Artransa Studios. There were some location scenes at Luna Park Melbourne and Bondi Beach. For one scene, Sydney residents on the shore were asked to leave their lights burning to provide a romantic backdrop to the action. Filming wound up in February 1959.

Borgnine said he found Australians very friendly.

Mills says he spent hours using tapes to get the Australian accent right. Notes came back from HHL during filming that they found his accent unintelligible but Mills refused to change it.

During filming Anne Baxter met Australian farmer Randolph Galt and they fell in love and later married.

The film was blacklisted by a British film union because not enough British people worked on it.

Release
The film was retitled Season of Passion for the American market. Although this was announced in November 1960 the film was not released in New York until 1962 on a double bill with The Happy Thieves, which was produced by James Hill, one of the three partners in Hecht-Hill-Lancaster Productions.

Reception

Critical
According to Sight and Sound "the first third" of the film was "a near disaster - slow, incoherent, dead" but that it improved.

The New York Times called it "an interesting, off beat movie... that is decidedly worth seeing."

According to Filmink magazine, "No one likes this film version, most blaming the happy ending, miscasting and change of locale. But Dighton's screenplay stuffs a superb source material...  his script was so bad. He had some good credits up to then (always in collaboration), but none after. I think he was one of those writers who got away with it for a bit then get found out."

Box office
According to a history of United Artists, the film was one of four movies by Hecht Hill Lancaster - the others were Rabbit Trap, Cry Tough and Take a Giant Step - that all went over budget as a group by $500,000 and all the films lost money. This, along with the poor box office performance of other HHL films like The Devil's Disciple, resulted in HHL being ultimately wound up.

References

External links
Summer of the Seventeenth Doll at Oz Movies
Summer of the Seventeenth Doll at IMDb
Summer of the Seventeenth Doll at BFI

1959 drama films
1959 films
Australian drama films
Australian films based on plays
British drama films
British films based on plays
Films based on works by Australian writers
Films directed by Leslie Norman
Films produced by Burt Lancaster
Films produced by James Hill
Films produced by Harold Hecht
Films scored by Benjamin Frankel
Norma Productions films
United Artists films
1950s English-language films
1950s British films